William Paul Sudakis (March 27, 1946 – September 15, 2021) was an American Major League Baseball infielder. He was primarily a third baseman, but also appeared as a catcher and first baseman.

Early years
He fared poorly in his first professional season with the Pioneer League's Pocatello Chiefs, batting just .214 with one home run and twelve runs batted in with an .843 fielding percentage at third base. The Dodgers experimented with Sudakis all over the infield during his next three seasons in the minors.

Los Angeles Dodgers
Later that year, Sudakis made his major league debut as a September call-up and immediately took over the starting third base job over incumbent Bob Bailey. He hit a home run in his first game, a come-from-behind victory over the Philadelphia Phillies, and led the Dodgers to a 3–0 victory over the St. Louis Cardinals with a first-inning two-run home run on September 21.

In , with rookie prospects Steve Garvey and Billy Grabarkewitz joining a crowded Dodgers infield, Manager Walter Alston experimented with Sudakis at catcher. The idea was seemingly abandoned in mid May, until the second game of an August 15 doubleheader against the Chicago Cubs. Sudakis appeared in 38 games behind the plate that season, throwing out just 6% of would-be base stealers (2 of 32). He had one of his better seasons with the bat, however, matching his previous season's home run total in nearly 200 fewer plate appearances. His .264 batting average was also a career high.

His knees kept him off the field until July 11, and prompted the Mets to use him mostly at first base. He appeared in only 18 games for the Mets, batting just .143 with one home run.

Texas Rangers
During spring training , the Texas Rangers acquired Sudakis from the Mets for minor league journeyman Bill McNulty. Though he appeared in just 82 games for the Rangers (mostly at first and third), he hit a career-high fifteen home runs. The designated hitter was introduced in the American League in 1973, a position Sudakis seemed ideally suited for. However, he made nine appearances at DH, and batted just .111 with two RBIs. Following the season, his contract was purchased by the New York Yankees.

New York Yankees
The Yankees platooned Sudakis at DH with left-handed hitter Ron Blomberg and used him as backup for Chris Chambliss at first base; he also appeared at third on occasion and made one appearance behind the plate. Following a 10–0 victory over the Cleveland Indians on September 29, the Yankees' flight to Milwaukee for a two-game set against the Brewers to end the season was delayed three hours. Upon arrival at the Pfister Towers Hotel in Milwaukee, Sudakis and back up catcher Rick Dempsey got into a fight in the hotel lobby. The fight was broken up by fellow catcher Thurman Munson, among others. Dave Pagan, Walt Williams and All-Star Bobby Murcer were all injured in the altercation, and Sudakis did not appear in either of the final two games of the season. He was dealt from the Yankees to the California Angels for Skip Lockwood at the Winter Meetings on December 3, 1974.

1975 season
Sudakis appeared in thirty games for the Angels, batting just .121 with one home run before he was released in late June. He immediately signed with the Indians, but fared only slightly better. In , he played for the Omaha Royals of the American Association in the Kansas City Royals system, but could not make it back to the major leagues.

Career statistics

He was part of a core of young Dodgers prospects that became known as "The Mod Squad" after the popular TV series of the same name, and appeared on the cover of the May 19,  edition of Sports Illustrated, along with his fellow Mod Squad members. From 1971 on, Sudakis caught 32% of potential base stealers (9 of 28) over the remainder of his career.

Personal life
Sudakis was of Lithuanian descent.

On September 27, 1985, Sudakis and Theodore Earl Turina were arrested on cocaine possession charges by undercover narcotics officers. $200,000 worth of cocaine was recovered at their Huntington Beach residence. Orange County Sheriff's Lieutenant Tom Conner said that Sudakis was armed with a handgun at the time of the arrest and that a second weapon was also seized. Conner said authorities plan to pursue charges for possession of handguns.

Sudakis died on September 15, 2021.

Footnotes

External links

1946 births
2021 deaths
Albuquerque Dodgers players
American people of Lithuanian descent
Arizona Instructional League Dodgers players
Baseball players from Illinois
California Angels players
Cleveland Indians players
Los Angeles Dodgers players
Major League Baseball third basemen
Memphis Blues players
New York Mets players
New York Yankees players
Omaha Royals players
Pocatello Chiefs players
Santa Barbara Dodgers players
Sportspeople from Joliet, Illinois
St. Petersburg Saints players
Texas Rangers players